Hugh Facy (fl. 1618; surname also Facey, Facie, Facye or Facio), was an English composer from the Renaissance. He composed largely choral or keyboard pieces.

Life 
Facy acted as an assistant to John Lugge, the organist at Exeter Cathedral and a secondary chorister. He possibly traveled abroad after his term at Exeter.

Music and influence 
It is believed that Facy had Roman Catholic sympathies. Because of this, his pieces tended to be influenced by Italy. His pieces are theorized to be composed outside of England.

Works 
 Ave Maris Stella - A keyboard piece. The only extant piece of the cantus firmus genre.
 Magnificat - Written in Latin instead of Facy's native tongue, English.

References

Renaissance composers
English classical composers
17th-century English musicians
English male classical composers
17th-century male musicians